Gray asexuality, grey asexuality, or gray-sexuality is the spectrum between asexuality and allosexuality (sexual attraction towards others). Individuals who identify with gray asexuality are referred to as being gray-A, gray ace, or grace, and make up what is referred to as the "ace umbrella".
Within this spectrum are terms such as demisexual, semisexual, asexual-ish and sexual-ish.

The emergence of online communities, such as the Asexual Visibility and Education Network (AVEN), has given gray aces locations to discuss their orientation.

Definitions

General 
Gray asexuality is considered the gray area between asexuality and sexuality, in which a person may only experience sexual attraction on occasion. The term demisexuality was coined in 2006 by Asexual Visibility and Education Network (AVEN). The prefix demi- derives from the Vulgar Latin , which comes from Latin , meaning "divided into two equal parts, halved." The term demisexual comes from the concept being described as being "halfway between" sexual and asexual.

The term gray-A covers a range of identities under the asexuality umbrella, or on the asexual spectrum, including demisexuality. Other terms within this spectrum include semisexual, asexual-ish and sexual-ish. The gray-A spectrum usually includes individuals who very rarely experience sexual attraction; they experience it only under specific circumstances. Sari Locker, a sexuality educator at Teachers College of Columbia University, argued during a Mic interview that gray-asexuals "feel they are within the gray area between asexuality and more typical sexual interest". A gray-A-identifying individual may have any romantic orientation, because sexual and romantic identities are not necessarily linked.

A gray-asexual may engage in sex with someone they have a strong connection to, but their relationship is not based on sex, nor do they crave sex. This can also be known as gray areas, which can be combined with different orientations, such as:

 A graysexual heteroromantic person: rarely sexually attracted to others.
 An asexual grayromantic person: not sexually attracted to anyone, but does experience being romantically attracted to others on rare occasions.
 A gray-pansexual aromantic person: rarely attracted to people sexually of all genders, but never are romantically attracted to anyone.
 A gynesexual gray-biromantic person: usually sexually attracted to women or feminine-presenting people; rarely experience romantic attraction towards more than one gender.

Aspec is a term which can be used to mean that one is on the asexual spectrum or aromantic spectrum.

Demisexuality 

A demisexual person does not experience sexual attraction until they have formed a strong emotional connection with a prospective partner. The definition of "emotional bond" varies from person to person inasmuch as the elements of the split attraction model can vary. Demisexuals can have any romantic orientation. People in the asexual spectrum communities often switch labels throughout their lives, and fluidity in orientation and identity is a common attitude.

Demisexuality, as a component of the asexuality spectrum, is included in queer activist communities such as GLAAD and The Trevor Project, and itself has finer divisions.

Demisexuality is a common theme (or trope) in romantic novels that has been termed 'compulsory demisexuality'. Within fictitious prose, the paradigm of sex being only truly pleasurable when the partners are in love is a trait stereotypically more commonly associated with female characters. The intimacy of the connection also allows for an exclusivity to take place.

Post-doctorate research on the subject has been done since at least 2013, and podcasts and social media have also raised public awareness of the sexual orientation. Some public figures, such as Michaela Kennedy-Cuomo, who have come out as demisexual have also raised awareness, though they typically face some degree of ridicule for their sexuality.
The word gained entry to the Oxford English Dictionary in March 2022, with its earliest usage (as a noun) dating to 2006.

Community 

Online communities, such as the Asexual Visibility and Education Network (AVEN), as well as blogging websites such as Tumblr, have provided ways for gray-As to find acceptance in their communities. While gray-As are noted to have variety in the experiences of sexual attraction, individuals in the community share their identification within the spectrum.

In society, there is a lack of understanding of who asexuals are. They often limit their interactions to an online platform. Asexuals have also found it safer to communicate through the use of symbols and slang. Asexuals are often referred to as aces. People are often under the misconception that asexuals hate sex or never have sex. For them, sex is not a focal point. This is where the term gray-asexual comes in. 

A black, gray, white, and purple flag is commonly used to display pride in the asexual community. The gray bar represents the area of gray sexuality within the community, and the flag is also used by those who identify as gray-asexual:

 The black stripe represents asexuality as a whole.
 The gray stripe is for asexuals who fall anywhere within the asexual spectrum, including gray-asexual and demi-sexual identities.
 The white stripe represents allies of asexuality, including the non-asexual partners of some asexual people.
 The purple represents the asexual community.

Research 
A 2019 survey by The Ace Community Survey reported that 10.9% asexual identified as gray-sexual and 9% identified as demisexual, though asexuality in general is relatively new to academic research and public discourse.

References

Bibliography

External links 
 The Asexual Visibility & Education Network
 Demisexuality Resource Center

Asexuality
Sexual orientation
Sexual attraction